Šubićeva Street is a street in Zagreb, Croatia. It connects Eugen Kvaternik Square with Petar Krešimir IV Square. It is located in the Zagreb district of Donji grad. Šubićeva Street is four-lane in its entire length with tram tracks between the roadways. Due to the tram tracks left-turns are forbidden at some intersections. The street intersects Vjekoslav Heinzel Avenue and Maksimirska Street at the Kvaternik Square, Zvonimirova Street, and Branimirova Avenue at the Petar Krešimir IV Square. As it passes the square, it changes its name to Marin Držić Avenue.

Sources

External links 

Ulica je važnija od zgrade 

Streets in Zagreb
Donji grad, Zagreb